Matthew Leon Jones OBE (born 9 October 1970) is a former English footballer who played as a winger. He was awarded an OBE in 2020 for services to education.

Club career
Jones began his senior career with Southend United in 1988, making five Football League appearances for the club, before moving to Chelmsford City in 1990. After three years at Chelmsford, Jones moved to Heybridge Swifts. In 1998, Jones joined former Heybridge manager Garry Hill at St Albans City. In 1999, Hill and Jones moved to Dagenham & Redbridge. On 29 May 2003, Jones signed for Canvey Island, after making in excess of 100 appearances at Dagenham. For the 2003–04 season, Jones re-signed for Chelmsford City, ten years after leaving the club.

Managerial career
In January 2006, Jones was appointed manager of Billericay Town. In 2007, Jones guided the club to the FA Cup first round for the third time in the club's history, setting up a tie with Swansea City. In November 2007, Jones was sacked as Billericay manager following a run of four straight league defeats.

Outside football
Jones is currently headteacher at Ark Globe Academy in Southwark.

References

1970 births
Living people
Association football wingers
English footballers
Black British sportsmen
Footballers from Chiswick
Southend United F.C. players
Chelmsford City F.C. players
Heybridge Swifts F.C. players
St Albans City F.C. players
Dagenham & Redbridge F.C. players
Canvey Island F.C. players
Billericay Town F.C. managers
Heads of schools in London
English Football League players
Southern Football League players
English football managers